Tech High, Tech High School, or Technical High School could refer to:

Brazil
Technical High School of Campinas
Technical High School of Limeira

India
Technical High School Payyoli

Jamaica
"Technical high school", the nomenclature for secondary education in Jamaica

United States
Arsenal Technical High School (1912-present) in Indianapolis, Indiana
Hutchinson Central Technical High School (1954-present) in Buffalo, New York
Wendell Krinn Technical High School in New Port Richey, Florida
Greene County Technical High School in Paragould, Arkansas
McKinley Technology High School (1926-1997; 2004-present), formerly McKinley Technical High School, in Washington, D.C.
Memphis Technical High School (1911-1987) in Memphis, Tennessee
Oakland Technical High School (1914-present) in Oakland, California
Technological High School, a former name of Midtown High School (1924-present) in Atlanta, Georgia
Technical High School (1923-present) in Omaha, Nebraska
Technical High School (Salt Lake City, Utah), in National Register of Historic Places listings in Salt Lake City
Technical Senior High School (1917-present) in Saint Cloud, Minnesota
Technology High School (Rohnert Park, California) in Rohnert Park, California
Technical High School, Springfield, Massachusetts (1905-1986)

United Kingdom
Technical High School could refer to a school set up after the 1944 Education Act that was midway between a Grammar School and a Secondary Modern School.